László Ludmann (born 10 May 1958) is a Hungarian sports shooter. He competed in the mixed trap event at the 1980 Summer Olympics.

References

1958 births
Living people
Hungarian male sport shooters
Olympic shooters of Hungary
Shooters at the 1980 Summer Olympics
Sport shooters from Budapest